The 3 arrondissements of the Cantal department are:

 Arrondissement of Aurillac, (prefecture of the Cantal department: Aurillac) with 93 communes. The population of the arrondissement was 82,391 in 2016.  
 Arrondissement of Mauriac, (subprefecture: Mauriac) with 55 communes.  The population of the arrondissement was 25,881 in 2016.  
 Arrondissement of Saint-Flour, (subprefecture: Saint-Flour) with 98 communes.  The population of the arrondissement was 37,697 in 2016.

History

In 1800 the arrondissements of Aurillac, Mauriac, Murat and Saint-Flour were established. The arrondissement of Murat was disbanded in 1926.

References

Cantal